In computer science, unbounded nondeterminism or unbounded indeterminacy is a property of concurrency by which the amount of delay in servicing a request can become unbounded as a result of arbitration of contention for shared resources while still guaranteeing that the request will eventually be serviced.  Unbounded nondeterminism became an important issue in the development of the denotational semantics of concurrency, and later became part of research into the theoretical concept of hypercomputation.

Fairness
Discussion of unbounded nondeterminism tends to get involved with discussions of fairness. The basic concept is that all computation paths must be "fair" in the sense that if the machine enters a state infinitely often, it must take every possible transition from that state. This amounts to requiring that the machine be guaranteed to service a request if it can, since an infinite sequence of states will only be allowed if there is no transition that leads to the request being serviced. Equivalently, every possible transition must occur eventually in an infinite computation, although it may take an unbounded amount of time for the transition to occur. This concept is to be distinguished from the local fairness of flipping a "fair" coin, by which it is understood that it is possible for the outcome to always be heads for any finite number of steps, although as the number of steps increases, this will almost surely not happen.

An example of the role of fair or unbounded nondeterminism in the merging of strings was given by William D. Clinger, in his 1981 thesis. He defined a "fair merge" of two strings to be a third string in which each character of each string must occur eventually. He then considered the set of all fair merges of two strings , assuming it to be a monotone function. Then he argued that , where  is the empty stream. He concluded that:
It appears that a fair merge cannot be written as a nondeterministic data flow program operating on streams.

On the possibility of implementing unbounded nondeterminism
Edsger Dijkstra argued that it is impossible to implement systems with unbounded nondeterminism. For this reason, Tony Hoare suggested that "an efficient implementation should try to be reasonably fair."

Nondeterministic automata
Nondeterministic Turing machines have only bounded nondeterminism.  Likewise sequential programs containing guarded commands as the only sources of nondeterminism have only bounded nondeterminism. Briefly, choice nondeterminism is bounded.  Gordon Plotkin gave a proof in his original paper on powerdomains:

Now the set of initial segments of execution sequences of a given nondeterministic program , starting from a given state, will form a tree. The branching points will correspond to the choice points in the program. Since there are always only finitely many alternatives at each choice point, the branching factor of the tree is always finite. That is, the tree is finitary. Now Kőnig's lemma says that if every branch of a finitary tree is finite, then so is the tree itself. In the present case this means that if every execution sequence of  terminates, then there are only finitely many execution sequences.

Indeterminacy versus nondeterministic automata
William Clinger provided the following analysis of the above proof by Plotkin:

This proof depends upon the premise that if every node  of a certain infinite branch can be reached by some computation , then there exists a computation  that visits every node  on the branch. ... Clearly this premise follows not from logic but rather from the interpretation given to choice points.  This premise fails for arrival nondeterminism [in the arrival of messages in the Actor model] because of finite delay [in the arrival of messages].  Though each node on an infinite branch must lie on a branch with a limit, the infinite branch need not itself have a limit.  Thus the existence of an infinite branch does not necessarily imply a nonterminating computation.

Unbounded nondeterminism and noncomputability
Spaan et al. have argued that it is possible for an unboundedly nondeterministic program to solve the halting problem; their algorithm consists of two parts defined as follows:

The first part of the program requests a natural number from the second part; after receiving it, it will iterate the desired Turing machine for that many steps, and accept or reject according to whether the machine has yet halted.

The second part of the program nondeterministically chooses a natural number on request. The number is stored in a variable which is initialized to 0; then the program repeatedly chooses whether to increment the variable, or service the request. The fairness constraint requires that the request eventually be serviced, for otherwise there is an infinite loop in which only the "increment the variable" branch is ever taken.

Clearly, if the machine does halt, this algorithm has a path which accepts. If the machine does not halt, this algorithm will always reject, no matter what number the second part of the program returns.

Arguments for dealing with unbounded nondeterminism
Clinger and Carl Hewitt  have developed a model (known as the Actor model) of concurrent computation with the property of unbounded nondeterminism built in [Clinger 1981; ; ; ]; this allows computations that cannot be implemented by Turing Machines, as seen above. However, these researchers emphasize that their model of concurrent computations  defined by Church, Kleene, Turing, etc.  (See Indeterminacy in concurrent computation.)

Hewitt justified his use of unbounded nondeterminism by arguing that there is no bound that can be placed on how long it takes a computational circuit called an arbiter to settle (see metastability in electronics).  Arbiters are used in computers to deal with the circumstance that computer clocks operate asynchronously with input from outside, e.g.., keyboard input, disk access, network input, etc.  So it could take an unbounded time for a message sent to a computer to be received and in the meantime the computer could traverse an unbounded number of states.

He further argued that Electronic mail enables unbounded nondeterminism since mail can be stored on servers indefinitely before being delivered, and that data links to servers on the Internet can likewise be out of service indefinitely. This gave rise to the unbounded nondeterminism controversy.

Hewitt's analysis of fairness

Hewitt argued that issues in fairness derive in part from the global state point of view.  The oldest models of computation (e.g.. Turing machines, Post productions, the lambda calculus, etc.) are based on mathematics that makes use of a global state to represent a computational step.  Each computational step is from one global state of the computation to the next global state.  The global state approach was continued in automata theory for finite state machines and push down stack machines including their nondeterministic versions.  All of these models have the property of bounded nondeterminism: if a machine always halts when started in its initial state, then there is a bound on the number of states in which it can halt.

Hewitt argued that there is a fundamental difference between choices in global state nondeterminism and the arrival order indeterminacy (nondeterminism) of his Actor model.  In global state nondeterminism, a "choice" is made for the "next" global state.  In arrival order indeterminacy, arbitration locally decides each arrival order in an unbounded amount of time. While a local arbitration is proceeding, unbounded activity can take place elsewhere.  There is no global state and consequently no "choice" to be made as to the "next" global state.

References

 
 
 
 
 
 
 
 
 
 
 
 
 
 
 
 

 Dana Scott.  What is Denotational Semantics?  MIT Laboratory for Computer Science Distinguished Lecture Series.  April 17, 1980.

 
 
 
 
 
 
 
 
 

Actor model (computer science)
Concurrency (computer science)
Models of computation
Process calculi
Denotational semantics